Ashe may refer to:

Places
 Ashe, Hampshire, England, a village
 Ashe County, North Carolina, United States

People 
Ashe (name), a given name and surname, including a list of people so named
Ashe (singer), American singer and songwriter

Fictional characters 
Ashe (Overwatch), a character in the 2016 video game
 "Ashe, The Frost Archer", a champion in League of Legends
 Ashe, a playable character in the 2007 video game Mega Man ZX Advent

Other uses
 Aṣẹ or ashe, a West African philosophical concept
 American Society of Hispanic Economists
 Ashe baronets, an extinct title in the Baronetage of England
 Ashe Cottage, Demopolis, Alabama, a house on the National Register of Historic Places
 ISO 639-3 code for the Koro Wachi language of Nigeria

See also 
Asche (disambiguation)
Ash (name)
Ash (disambiguation)
Ashes (disambiguation)